The Direct Fly Alto is a Czech ultralight and light-sport aircraft, designed and produced by Direct Fly sro of Hluk. The aircraft is supplied as a standard or quick-build kit for amateur construction or as a complete ready-to-fly-aircraft.

Design and development
The aircraft was designed to comply with the Fédération Aéronautique Internationale microlight class and US light-sport aircraft rules. It features a cantilever low-wing, a two-seats-in-side-by-side configuration enclosed cockpit, fixed tricycle landing gear or optionally conventional landing gear and a single engine in tractor configuration.

Standard engines available are the  Rotax 912UL, the  Rotax 912ULS and the  Jabiru 3300 four-stroke powerplants.

A Magnum 501 rocket powered parachute system is under development for the aircraft.

The Alto TG design was issued a Czech type certificate on 15 July 2008 and produced until 2022. The Alto NG replaced the original model in production in 2022.

In 2011 the design was accepted as a Federal Aviation Administration approved special light-sport aircraft.

The Alto NG replaced the original TG model in production in 2022.

Operational history
The aircraft was introduced to the US light sport market at the 2010 Sun 'n Fun airshow.

In July 2022 there were five Altos registered  with the US Federal Aviation Administration.

Variants
Alto TG
Tricycle landing gear version with a  gross weight.
Alto TW
Tailwheel (conventional gear) model.
Alto 100
Version for the American light sport aircraft market.
Alto NG
Improved "New Generation" version introduced in 2022. This model has a  gross weight, strengthened nosewheel landing gear leg and fuselage, longer engine mount and cowling for the Rotax 912 ULS engine, plus uses push-pull tubes in place of control cables.

Specifications (Alto TG European ultralight)

See also

References

External links

2000s Czech ultralight aircraft
Homebuilt aircraft
Light-sport aircraft
Single-engined tractor aircraft
Direct Fly sro aircraft